The 1929–30 international cricket season was from September 1929 to April 1930.

Season overview

October

MCC in Australia

December

Bombay XI in Ceylon

January

England in New Zealand

England in the West Indies

March

England in Argentina

April

Australia in Ceylon

References

International cricket competitions by season
1929 in cricket
1930 in cricket